Zhu Lin was the defending champion and successfully defended her title, defeating Liu Fangzhou in the final, 6–0, 6–2.

Seeds

Draw

Finals

Top half

Bottom half

References
Main Draw

Jin'an Open - Singles
Jin'an Open